Chapel Hill Independent School District is a public school district based in unincorporated Smith County, Texas (USA), near Tyler.  The district is located in east central Smith County and covers the city of New Chapel Hill, the community of Jackson, and a small portion of Tyler.

In 2009, the school district was rated "academically acceptable" by the Texas Education Agency.

Schools
Wise Elementary School (Grades PK-5)
Jackson Elementary School (Grades PK-5)
W.L. Kissam Elementary School (Grades PK-5)
Chapel Hill Middle School (Grades 6-8)
WINGS Alternative School (Grades 6-12)
Chapel Hill High School (Grades 9-12)

References

External links
Chapel Hill ISD

School districts in Smith County, Texas
Education in Tyler, Texas